Pillager is a city in Cass County, Minnesota, United States. The population was 469 at the 2010 census. It is part of the Brainerd Micropolitan Statistical Area.

History
A post office called Pillager has been in operation since 1886.  The city was named after the Pillager Band of Chippewa Indians.

Geography
Pillager is located in Sylvan Township (T133N R30W), on the left (north) bank of the Crow Wing River, just east of Lake Placid.

Minnesota State Highway 210 and County Road 1 are the main routes in the community.

Demographics

2010 census
As of the census of 2010, there were 469 people, 190 households, and 124 families living in the city. The racial makeup of the city was 96.8% White, 0.2% African American, 1.3% Native American, 0.2% Pacific Islander, 0.4% from other races, and 1.1% from two or more races. Hispanic or Latino of any race were 1.3% of the population.

There were 190 households, of which 34.2% had children under the age of 18 living with them, 50.5% were married couples living together, 12.1% had a female householder with no husband present, 2.6% had a male householder with no wife present, and 34.7% were non-families. 26.8% of all households were made up of individuals, and 12.1% had someone living alone who was 65 years of age or older. The average household size was 2.47 and the average family size was 2.99.

The median age in the city was 36.1 years. 26% of residents were under the age of 18; 9.4% were between the ages of 18 and 24; 26.2% were from 25 to 44; 21.4% were from 45 to 64; and 17.1% were 65 years of age or older. The gender makeup of the city was 50.7% male and 49.3% female.

2000 census
As of the census of 2000, there were 420 people, 167 households, and 106 families living in the city. The racial makeup of the city was 97.38% White, 1.43% Native American, 0.95% Asian, and 0.24% from two or more races. Hispanic or Latino of any race were 0.48% of the population.

There were 167 households, out of which 35.3% had children under the age of 18 living with them, 47.3% were married couples living together, 10.2% had a female householder with no husband present, and 36.5% were non-families. 28.1% of all households were made up of individuals, and 16.2% had someone living alone who was 65 years of age or older.  The average household size was 2.45 and the average family size was 3.03.

In the city, the population was spread out, with 26.4% under the age of 18, 11.7% from 18 to 24, 29.5% from 25 to 44, 19.8% from 45 to 64, and 12.6% who were 65 years of age or older.  The median age was 31 years. For every 100 females, there were 112.1 males.  For every 100 females age 18 and over, there were 98.1 males.

The median income for a household in the city was $29,375, and the median income for a family was $34,792. Males had a median income of $25,962 versus $18,438 for females. The per capita income for the city was $14,291.  About 6.2% of families and 8.0% of the population were below the poverty line, including 10.0% of those under age 18 and 3.1% of those age 65 or over.

References

Cities in Cass County, Minnesota
Cities in Minnesota
Brainerd, Minnesota micropolitan area